The Allahverdi Khan Bridge, popularly known as Si-o-se-pol, is the largest of the eleven historical bridges on the Zayanderud, the largest river of the Iranian Plateau, in Isfahan, Iran.

The bridge was built in the early 17th century to serve as both a bridge and a dam. It is a popular recreational gathering place, and is one of the most famous examples of Iran's Safavid architecture.

History
Si-o-se-pol (meaning the bridge of 33 Persian) was built between 1599 and 1602, under the reign of Abbas I, the fifth Safavid king (shah) of Iran. It was constructed under the supervision of Allahverdi Khan Undiladze, the commander-in-chief of the armies, who was of Georgian origin, and was also named after him. The bridge served particularly as a connection between the mansions of the elite, as well as a link to the city's vital Armenian neighborhood of New Julfa.

In years of drought (2000–02 and 2013), the river was dammed upstream to provide water for Yazd province.

Structure
It is a vaulted arch bridge consisting of two superimposed rows of 33 arches, from whence its popular name of Si-o-se-pol comes, and is made of stone. The interior of Si-o-se-pol was originally decorated with paintings, which were often described by travelers as erotic.

There is a larger base plank at the start of the bridge, under which the Zayanderud flows, supporting a tea house, which is nowadays abandoned.

Gallery

Transportation
  Chaharbagh Street
  Motahari Street
  Kamaloddin Esmaeil Street
  Chahar Bagh Bala Street
  Mellat Street
  Ayenekhaneh Street
  Enqelab Metro Station
  Si-o-se Pol Metro Station

References

Further reading
 

Tourist attractions in Isfahan
Bridges in Isfahan
Bridges in Iran
Bridges completed in 1602
1602 establishments in Iran
Safavid architecture